Yurchenko, also known as round-off entry vaults, are a family of vaults performed in artistic gymnastics in which the gymnast does a round-off onto the springboard and a back handspring onto the horse or vaulting table. The gymnast then performs a salto, which may range in difficulty from a simple single tuck to a triple twist layout. Different variations in the difficulty of the salto lead to higher D-scores. This family of vaults is the most common type of vault in gymnastics and its named after Natalia Yurchenko, who first performed it in 1982.

Background and history 
The Yurchenko vault family is named after Natalia Vladimirovna Yurchenko, a gymnast who trained under Vladislav Rastorotski. The pair designed a new way of moving onto the vaulting horse. They first tested the new approach by using a foam pit, and then introduced the move to the runway and vault horse. In 1982, she performed the vault for the first time at a competition in Moscow. The move’s popularity grew after Elena Shushunova won the gold medal at the 1985 World Championships with the full-twisting Yurchenko vault

The vault gained popularity quickly with the introduction of the new vault table in 2001 because of a decreased risk of injury. During the 2009 World Championships, all participating females included at least one Yurchenko vault. Yurchenko is now the most commonly mentioned name in gymnastics competitions.

Technique 
The Yurchenko vault has seven steps: the run, the hurdle, the takeoff, pre-flight, the block, post-flight, and the landing.

The run 
The gymnast begins the vault by running down an 82 foot-long runway, because gaining speed and maintaining control are necessary to create the energy and momentum used throughout the rest of the vault.

The hurdle and the roundoff 
At the end of the run, the gymnast performs a low skipping motion called the hurdle to begin the roundoff. The roundoff, a quick cartwheel, is then performed onto the springboard with the gymnast's hands placed just before the springboard and their feet on the springboard itself. The roundoff is the portion of the movement that distinguishes the move as belonging to the Yurchenko family of vaults. Other vault families include the Tsukahara which consists of a different entry onto the table.

The takeoff 
After the roundoff, the gymnast leaves the springboard and is propelled upwards. In a Yurchenko style vault the gymnast will leave the springboard with their back to the vault in a tight upper arch position.

Pre-flight 
During the pre-flight the gymnast moves in a backwards rotation shifting the center of motion upward performing a back handspring onto the vault. The gymnast attempts to hold a straight bodyline position until they reach a near handstand position on the vault.

The block 
The block defines the transition from pre-flight to post-flight. The gymnast makes contact with the vault with straight arms and uses their shoulders as springs to enter the air and obtain adequate height. All horizontal momentum is now vertical momentum.

Post-flight 
Post flight time is determined by the vertical velocity of the gymnast as they leave the block and the center of motion moves upward. The post flight is characterized by the variation that the gymnast performs. For instance, the Amanar post-flight consists of two and a half twisting flips.

The landing 
The gymnast aims to land completely vertical and perpendicular to the ground  to prevent unwanted steps which would result in a loss of points. The body is fully extended with the knees slightly flexed in order to absorb forces as ground contact is made and the arms extended straight forward.

Variations 
Any vault with a roundoff-back handspring entry is classified as a "Yurchenko-style" vault in the Code of Points. Many variations of the original vault have been introduced by gymnasts in international competitions. Even as of 2019, gymnasts and coaches continue to develop more difficult versions of the Yurchenko.

Back handspring entry (off the table):
 Dungelova: Roundoff, back handspring entry; tucked salto backwards with 2/1 turn (720°) off
 1½ twisting Yurchenko: Roundoff, back handspring entry; one and a half twisting layout. Abbreviated as 1.5Y.
 Baitova (more commonly referred to as Double Twisting Yurchenko): Roundoff, backhandspring entry; double twisting layout. Abbreviated as DTY.
 Amanar/Shewfelt (2½ twisting Yurchenko): Roundoff, back handspring entry; two and a half twisting layout.
 Triple twisting Yurchenko
Shirai: 3½ twisting Yurchenko
Twisting entry (springboard to table):
 Luconi: Roundoff, back handspring with ¾ turn entry; back tuck/pike/layout somersault
 Omelianchik:  Roundoff, back handspring with half turn entry; piked salto fwd off
 Ivantcheva: Roundoff, back handspring with half turn entry; tucked salto fwd off
 Servente: Roundoff, back handspring with half turn entry; tucked salto fwd with ½ turn (180°) off
 Podkopayeva: Roundoff, back handspring with half turn entry; front pike somersault with ½ twist
 López: Roundoff, back handspring with half turn entry; front layout somersault with ½ twist
 Khorkina:  Roundoff, back handspring with half turn entry; front tuck somersault with 1½ twist
 Mustafina: Roundoff, back handspring with half turn entry; front stretched somersault with 1 full twist
 Cheng: Roundoff, back handspring with half turn entry; front stretched somersault with 1½ twist
 Biles: Roundoff, back handspring with half turn entry; front stretched somersault with 2 twists

Scoring 
Yurchenko vaults follow the same scoring assessment as other gymnastics categories. The gymnast is judged by a final F-score, which is the sum of the D-score and E-score. The D-score correlates to the difficulty of the move and the E-score correlates to the execution of the move. Yurchenko vaults are typically awarded higher D-scores due to the difficulty of their characteristic round-off entry with a half turn in the first phase of flight. D-scores are also influenced by the degrees of rotation around the transversal and longitudinal axes of motion during the second phase of flight, which means that the different variations have different D-scores. The Yurchenko double pike, first performed by Simone Biles, has the highest D-score of any Yurchenko variation. The move consists of two flips in the pike position where the legs are extended straight and the body is folded forward at the waist. The vault group in the Code of Points is officially called "Round off with or without 1/2 to 1/1 turn (180-360 degrees) in entry phase (Yurchenko entry) - Salto forward or backward with or without long axis turn in second flight phase".

See also 
Yurchenko loop
Julissa Gomez
 Produnova
 Simone Biles

References

Further reading
Diener, Ligia; Aedo-Muñoz, Esteban. SYSTEMATIC REVIEW OF YURCHENKO VAULT KINETIC AND KINEMATIC INDICATORS Science of Gymnastics Journal; Ljubljana Vol. 11, Iss. 1,  (2019): 115-123.

Vaults (gymnastics)